"Cat and Mouse" is the fifty-ninth episode and the twenty-fourth episode of the third season (1988–89) of the television series The Twilight Zone. In this episode, a fairy tale enthusiast becomes the latest lover of an immortal man who takes on the form of a cat during the day.

Plot
A timid, mousy woman named Andrea "Andie" Moffatt works in a pharmacy. Her coworker Carl asks her out, but she refuses his advances. Her coworker Elaine badgers her to stop rejecting men and believing in the romance novel version of men. At home, Andie sees a stray black cat come through her window. She takes it in and feeds it, then takes a shower. Andie comes out to discover a man wearing her bathrobe and drinking coffee. She starts to call the police, but he disarms her by transforming back into the cat she took in. He reveals his name is Guillaume and he is a centuries-old Frenchman. After being caught in an affair with a married woman, he was cursed to be trapped as a cat during the day. He may freely transform at night, and says that over his lifetime he has taught many women how to love. He seduces Andie and they have sex.

The next day, Andie returns to work, very happy and chipper. When Elaine discovers the pharmacy is doing inventory, she slips her "downers" that she has been stealing into Andie's purse. To please Guillaume, Andie dresses less and less "dowdy", wearing makeup and doing her hair. After he presses her to get herself some sexy clothing, Elaine noses into Andie's purchases and discovers lingerie. Wondering whom it is for, Elaine decides to spy on Andie. Dissatisfied with the coffee Andie has, Guillaume sends her out for something different. One Andie leaves, Elaine makes her way inside and Guillaume seduces her.

Andie returns to see Elaine leaving Guillaume. Guillaume mentions the encounter without Andie asking and says it is time for him to move on. Andie asks for one more night, and Guillaume relents. She offers to make coffee and puts Elaine's "downers" in it. Andie gets a call and agrees to a date with Carl. Guillaume passes out from the drugged coffee. He awakens as a cat at the veterinarian with Andie giving orders to have him "fixed", i.e. neutered.

External links
 

1989 American television episodes
The Twilight Zone (1985 TV series season 3) episodes

fr:Le Chat et la Souris (La Cinquième Dimension)